iPulse Medical is an Israeli start-up company that makes femtech products. The company's brand and main product, Livia, is a menstrual pain relief wearable device.

History

iPulse Medical was founded by Israeli tech entrepreneur Chen Nachum in 2015. The idea for Livia came from his father, Zvi Nachum, a medical products inventor. In April 2016, The company launched Livia on crowdfunding site Indiegogo, where it had generated sales of $1,741,622 as of December 19, 2018.

On April 11, 2018, the product received the Gold prize for Health & Wellness: Women's Wellbeing category at the Edison Awards.

Technical

Livia is used during menstruation to eliminate cramps and pain. It employs the principle of gate control theory to organically block pain receptors by sending continuous electrical pulses through electrodes along the body's nerve pathways in order to block out the pain signals before they reach the central nervous system. This is done using a specific frequency and length of its electrical pulses, which block out the specific type of pain associated with menstruation. The device has undergone a clinical trial, of which no results have been published.

Further reading
 Femtech

References 

Science and technology in Israel
Medical technology
Women's health